Goran Bjelogrlić is a Serbian film producer.

Goran is the older brother of Serbian movie star Dragan Bjelogrlić. Together they own and operate a production house Cobra Films. The latest project with his production was Shadows over Balkan.

Filmography
 Shadows over Balkan (2017–2019) (producer)
 See You in Montevideo (2014) (producer)
 Montevideo, God Bless You! (2010) (producer)
 Vratice se rode (2007–2008) (producer)
 Ivkova slava (2005) (producer)
 Mali svet (2003) (producer)
 Skoro sasvim obicna prica (2003) (executive producer)
 Rat uzivo (2000) (executive producer)
 Rane (1998)
 Lepa sela lepo gore (1996) (executive producer) (producer)

References

Living people
Serbian film producers
Year of birth missing (living people)